Flying Heroes is a fantasy action game produced by Take 2 Interactive, Illusion Softworks, and Pterodon.

Gameplay

Reception

Flying Heroes was released to mixed reviews. The positive reviews included IGN awarding it an 8.3/10 Eurogamer 9/10, and GameSpot UK 7.8/10. The less positive reviews included, GameZone, who awarded 3/10, PCZone, who awarded 47/100, and PC Gamer, who awarded 51/100.

The game has sold over 100,000 units as of 2002.

References

2000 video games
2K Czech games
Action video games
Windows games
Windows-only games
Video games developed in the Czech Republic
Take-Two Interactive games
Pterodon (company) games